Enrique Waldemar Méndez Martijena (born 20 May 1971), known as Waldemar Méndez, is an Argentine naturalized Chilean footballer who played for clubs of Argentina and Chile.

Career
A product of Ferro Carril Oeste, he moved to Chile and played in both the Primera B and the Primera División for clubs such as Unión La Calera, Deportes Ovalle, Deportes La Serena, among others. Along with Deportes La Serena, he won the 1996 Primera B, getting promotion to the Primera División.

Following his retirement, he graduated as a football manager. In 2006, he assumed as interim coach of Magallanes in the Primera B de Chile.

Personal life
He naturalized Chilean by residence and Spanish by descent.

On 29 February 2020, he married María Gracia Subercaseaux, a Chilean photographer and media personality.

He worked as a in-match analyst for Canal del Futbol, commonly known as "CDF", a cable soccer channel that holds the exclusive TV rights to all the matches of the first and second division of the Chilean professional league. Then he joined ESPN Chile for the program ESPN F90 (before ESPN Radio).

Honours
Deportes La Serena
 Primera B (1): 1996

References

External links
 

1971 births
Living people
Sportspeople from Buenos Aires Province
Argentine footballers
Argentine expatriate footballers
Argentine emigrants to Chile
Chilean footballers
Association football goalkeepers
Ferro Carril Oeste footballers
Unión La Calera footballers
Deportes Ovalle footballers
Deportes La Serena footballers
Deportes Melipilla footballers
Deportes Temuco footballers
O'Higgins F.C. footballers
Provincial Osorno footballers
Primera B de Chile players
Chilean Primera División players
Argentine Primera División players
Argentine expatriate sportspeople in Chile
Expatriate footballers in Chile
Naturalized citizens of Chile
Argentine football managers
Expatriate football managers in Chile
Chilean football managers
Magallanes managers
Primera B de Chile managers
Citizens of Spain through descent
Chilean association football commentators
Canal del Fútbol color commentators
Chilean radio personalities